PRIMA may refer to:
 PHIL Music, The Philippine Recording Industry Music Association (PHIL Music) or PRIMA
 PRIMA (Indonesia), interchange bank network in Indonesia
 Just and Prosperous People's Party, political party in Indonesia